The Côn Đảo ("Côn Island") are an archipelago of Bà Rịa–Vũng Tàu province, in the Southeast region of Vietnam, and also a district of this province.

Geography 
The total land area reaches  and the local population is about 5,000.

The islands are composed of magmatic rocks of different ages. Hòn Bảy Cạnh, Hòn Cau and Hòn Bông Lang are composed of cretaceous microgranite rocks. The northern part of Côn Đảo Island is composed of quartz diorite and granite - granodiorite of late mesozoic- early cenozoic age, and is partially covered by quaternary marine sediments. The southern part of this island and Hòn Bà island are composed of the rhyolite and intrusive formations of unknown age. On the western slope of Côn Đảo Island, there exist groups of outcrops of diorite and microgranite penetrated by big quartz bands .

The island group is served by Côn Đảo airport situated on the largest island in the archipelago, Côn Sơn Island. Côn Sơn airport has IATA airport code is VCS. Total size of Côn Đảo Airport is 3.792 square meter, with 1 runway has 1.830 meter. It can handle 400.000 passengers per year. Currently, Vietnam Airlines (Operated by VASCO), Bamboo Airways and Southern Service Flight Company are three airlines operating flights to the island.

History
On June 16, 1702, the English East India Company founded a settlement on Pulo Condore as an entrepôt for ships plying between India and China. Three years later, on 2 March 1705, the Bugis mercenaries hired by the Englishmen muntinied and murdered the agents, destroyed the factory, and expelled the remaining settlers.

During the internecine wars for the Court of Huế, the Nguyen Prince Nguyễn Phúc Ánh ceded the islands to France in the Treaty of Versailles (1787) in return for military assistance. The treaty however was abrogated as France failed to provide the aid.

It was only under conquest that the islands came under French control in 1861. During the French colonial era Côn Sơn Island was made infamous for its penal facilities and the notorious "tiger cages". Vietnamese and Cambodian nationalists and revolutionaries were sent here to serve their sentence for anti-French activities. Many Vietnamese Communist leaders were "schooled" on Côn Đảo Island as well.

The French Indochinese government named the group of islands Poulo-Condore Islands, a name that derives from the islands' Malay name Pulo Condore (pulau meaning "island" and kundur meaning "wax gourd"). The islands can be identified with Claudius Ptolemy’s Satyrorum insulae (Isles of the Satyrs), a name probably drawn from the monkeys endemic to the islands, the  Con Song Long-tailed Macaque (Macaca fascicularis ssp.Condorensis). Ptolemy refers to the three islands inhabited by people, 'said to have tails such as they depict satyrs having'.

In 2020, the U.S. Navy sent ships on freedom of navigation exercises around the islands to challenge what they deemed to be Vietnam's "excessive maritime claims."

Côn Đảo National Park
Many of the islands were given protected status in 1984 as part of Côn Đảo National Park. This natural preserve was subsequently enlarged in 1998. Endangered species protected within the park include the hawksbill turtle, the green turtle, dolphins, and the dugong. Ecosystems represented in the park include seagrass meadow, mangrove and coral reefs.

Côn Đảo National Park is working with the World Wildlife Fund (WWF) Vietnam to further protection in the marine areas, with programs to establish a Marine Protected Area that protects coral reefs, seagrass beds and species, while also developing sustainable nature-based ecotourism. The island's management is strongly geared towards sustainable use, hoping to learn from previous experiences in Vietnam and the region to balance development with conservation.

Ferry 
A hydrofoil service from Vũng Tàu to Côn Đảo was started in February 2019. The service is a daily return and boasts that the ferry will operate year round, regardless of the weather. Travel time is 4–5 hours, departing Vũng Tàu at 8am and returning from Côn Đảo at around 2pm.

Two ferries operate between Côn Đảo and the mainland. There is a daily overnight hour ferry service from Vũng Tàu which, in addition to bringing passengers, serves as the main source of importing goods to the islands. The ferry operates on a daily basis, however in winter months the service depends largely on weather conditions as the seas between Côn Đảo and the mainland can be rough.

In 2016 a ferry service primarily for passengers opened up between Sóc Trăng and Côn Đảo, shortening the length of the journey to three hours. With the addition of a fast ferry to the islands, the islands have experienced an increase in tourism fueled mostly by domestic tourists who view Côn Đảo as a sacred place due to its history.

List of islands
Côn Đảo Islands include 16 islands, with a total area of 76 km²:

 Côn Lôn Island or Côn Sơn (French: Grande-Condore), Phú Hải, 51.52 km²
 Little Côn Lôn Island (Petite-Condore), or Hòn Bà, Phú Sơn, 5.45 km²
 Bảy Cạnh Island, or Bãi Cạnh Island, Phú Hòa, 5.5 km²
 Cau Island, or Phú Lệ 1.8 km²
 Bông Lan Island, or Bông Lang, Bông Lau, Phú Phong, 0.2 km²
 Vung Island, or Phú Vinh 0.15 km²
 Ngọc Island, or Trọc Island, hòn Trai, Phú Nghĩa, 0.4 km²
 Trứng Island, or Đá Bạc Island, Đá Trắng Island, Phú Thọ, 0.1 km²
 Tài Lớn Island, or Phú Bình 0.38 km²
 Tài Nhỏ Island, or Thỏ Island, Phú An, 0.1 km²
 Trác Lớn Island, or Phú Hưng 0.25 km²
 Trác Nhỏ Island, or Phú Thịnh 0.1 km²
 Tre Lớn Island, or Phú Hòa 0.75 km²
 Tre Nhỏ Island, or Phú Hội, 0.25 km²
 Anh Island, or Trứng Lớn Island
 Em Island, or Trứng Nhỏ Island

See also  

 Thứ phi Hoàng Phi Yến, local legend.

References

External links

Con Dao photos
 The Kun Lun Shan islands are shown on sheet 11 of the Mao Kun map Wu Bei Zhi at the Library of Congress
Vietnamese Sea and Islands – position Resources, and  typical geological and ecological wonders. Publisher Science and Technology. Ha Noi, Editor: Nguyen Khoa Son, . In Vietnamese

Districts of Bà Rịa-Vũng Tàu province
Bà Rịa-Vũng Tàu province
Archipelagoes of Vietnam
Landforms of Bà Rịa-Vũng Tàu province
Former British colonies and protectorates in Asia
States and territories established in 1702
Former populated places in Vietnam
Islands of the South China Sea
Former penal colonies
1702 establishments in the British Empire